Boris Zeisser (born 29 April 1968, Alkmaar) is an internationally active Dutch architect, based in Rotterdam.

Education and career
Inspired by multiple visits to Frank Lloyd Wright’s Fallingwater and this type of relation between architecture and nature, Boris Zeisser decided to study and practice architecture. After graduating with an honorable mention from Delft University in 1995, he worked for the Dutch office  Erick Van Egeraat Architects (1996-2000). On 1 January 2001 he established 24H>architecture, together with Maartje Lammers.

Selected works
Dragspelhuset, Sweden, 2001-2004
Ecological Children Activity and Education Center, Koh-Kood, Thailand, 2006-2007
Housing for musicians, Hoogvliet, Netherlands, 2007-2010
Contemplating the Void, Guggenheim Museum, New York, United States, 2010
Dutch barn, Alkmaar, Netherlands, 2011
Housing Nieuw Leyden, Leiden, Netherlands, 2009-2011

Bibliography

References

External links
Official website
Official blog
Official website Dragspelhuset

1968 births
Living people
Dutch company founders
Artists from Rotterdam
People from Alkmaar
Delft University of Technology alumni
20th-century Dutch architects
21st-century Dutch architects